Hoeyang Airport (a.k.a. Hoeyang Southeast Airport) is an airport in Hoeyang, Kangwon-do, North Korea.

Facilities 
The airfield has a single gravel runway 15/33 measuring 3650 x 253 feet (1113 x 77 m).  It is sited in a river valley approximately 18 km east-northeast of Hyon Ni Airport.

References 

Airports in North Korea
Kangwon Province (North Korea)